The Saskatchewan Railway Museum is a railway museum located west of Saskatoon, Saskatchewan at the intersection of the Pike Lake Highway (Hwy 60) and the Canadian National Railway tracks (on "Hawker" siding). It is operated by the Saskatchewan Railroad Historical Association (SRHA) and was opened in 1990.

Images

Locomotives
The museum has a Canadian Pacific S-3 locomotive originally built by the Montreal Locomotive Works in 1957 to a design originally developed by the American Locomotive Company.  Between 2001 and 2006 the S-3 was restored and painted in original period colours and is now on display.

The museum has a smaller General Electric  diesel electric locomotive built in 1941. This unit was originally used by the US Army and US Air Force before being purchased by SaskPower for use on the Saskatoon coal-fired A. L. Cole power plant before the site was decommissioned. This is augmented with a Canadian Pacific trackmobile built by crane manufacturer Whiting Corporation in 1957.

Street cars 

The Saskatoon Municipal Railway operated street cars (also known as trams) from New Year's Day 1913 until 1951. They had a cumulative total of 56 streetcars; three of which are now owned by the museum. Car 40, built by the Preston Car Company in 1911, was originally used in Calgary before being obtained by Saskatoon in 1919. It was one of seven units obtained from a trade with Calgary for six larger units that were too heavy to cross the Traffic Bridge. Car 51 was built by the National Steel Car company in 1927, and operated in Saskatoon until the end of street car service. Both of these cars have been restored to original colours.

Car 203 was built by the Cincinnati Car Company in 1918. It was in service in Cleveland, Ohio and the city of London, Ontario before being purchased by Saskatoon. Restoration on this car has not started.

Passenger and freight service cars 

The Canadian Pacific kirkella is on display. It was built by the Pullman Company in 1913 as a first class sleeping car; it was in regular service until 1956 when it was converted for use on a work train as a carman's sleeper. The car was used when filming Summer of the Monkeys.

The museum has Canadian Pacific and Canadian National boxcars, flat beds and a hopper car on display. A Cominco tank car is also on display.

Special cars 

The museum has two snow ploughs on display. The Canadian Pacific plow was manufactured in 1913, while the Canadian National plow was manufactured in 1927.

The museum has speeders, wash cars and boarding cars used by work crews on display. Also on display is a  diesel emergency generator car built by Canadian Car and Foundry in 1928 and owned by SaskPower.

Buildings 

The buildings are former railway stations and service buildings moved to the site from other parts of Saskatchewan.

Canadian Northern Railway
 Six Person Bunkhouse circa 1919 from Maymont; now used as a gift shop
 Brisbin Station circa 1918, originally used in Debden before being moved to Brisbin
 Borden Tool Shed

Canadian Pacific Railway
 Register Building, built 1915, Cory
 New Humboldt Tool Shed
 Old Humboldt Tool Shed
 Outlook Tool Shed, built 1915

Canadian National Railway
 Nutana Engineman's Bunkhouse, now used as the museum centre

Grand Trunk Pacific Railway
 Oban Interlocking Tower
 Unity Express Shed, built 1919
 Agro Station, built 1913

Affiliations
The museum is affiliated with CMA, CHIN, and Virtual Museum of Canada.

See also 

 Biggar railway station
 C.N. Industrial
 Eaton Internment Camp
 Saskatoon railway station – current
 Saskatoon Railway Station (Canadian Pacific) – historic
 Sutherland
 Union Station (Regina)
 Canadian Pacific Railway
 List of heritage railways in Canada
 History of rail transport in Canada

References

External links
 Home page

Corman Park No. 344, Saskatchewan
Railway museums in Saskatchewan
Museums in Saskatoon